= Ntiva =

American information technology company

NTIVA
- Company type: Subsidiary
- Industry: IT
- Founded: 2004
- Headquarters: McLean, Virginia, US
- Area served: United States
- Key people: Steven Freidkin (CEO)
- Number of employees: 712~ (including The Purple Guys)
- Parent: PSP Partners (January 2022-present)
- Website: https://www.ntiva.com/

Ntiva is an information technology company providing IT consulting, managed IT services and cyber security services with headquarters in McLean, Virginia, United States. The company was founded by Steven Freidkin when he was a teen in high school. Ntiva was formed after Freidkin graduated in 2004. The company was named one of Inc. magazine's "500's Fastest Growing Companies in America" five years in a row. Ntiva has several branch office locations including Washington DC, Chicago, New York City and Long Island, NY. The company in 2018, 2019, 2020, and 2021 was awarded by CRN, a brand of The Channel Company, the Triple Crown Award, recognizing notable information technology solution providers and technology integrators.

In April 2024, Ntiva announced the acquisition of another business offering similar services, The Purple Guys. Though Ntiva had acquired many companies before, this is Ntiva's largest acquisition up to this point.
